The Booo Krooo (occasionally also spelled Boo Kroo) started life as a comic strip and then turned into a web-series and then a UK adult animated sitcom created by Matt Mason, Alex Donne Johnson and Julian (Art Jaz) Johnson for the now defunct British TV network Channel U (now called Now 70s).  The series follows the mis-adventures of three up-and-coming grime/rap MCs who are constantly trying to find ways to get famous, get girls or save the world.

Matt Mason voices most of the main characters with help from Fabio Scianna. The TV series originated from a web-series created whilst the production team were running the RWD magazine website and forum. Taking hints from underground music culture and the intersection between UK garage and grime, the 3 episode web series was shortly co-signed by Missy Elliott after her PR team asked to feature the artist as part of the campaign for her hit single "Work It". The series then acquired a 6-episode deal on Channel U and recorded a music video with UK garage producer Sticky, famous for hits such as "Booo!" featuring Ms. Dynamite.

In 2004, the Prince's Trust featured the Booo Krooo as part of the marketing campaign for their first Urban Music Festival featuring the likes of Jay-Z, Beyoncé and a young up-and-coming Dizzee Rascal.

Also in 2004, the Booo Krooo gained interest from Christian Fussenegger and Arte TV, a German music and youth magazine program who asked to feature the Booo Krooo in a 10-minute slot. The director claimed: "French-German TV Arte is viewed as one of the best channels in the world. We would like to include the Booo Krooo in a piece about the garage-offshoots, show their videos or even do a little 'interview' with them, why? Because they tackle topics that are not purely music related and consumer-orientated, which makes them really interesting."

In 2005, the series came to a halt after the production team decided to pursue other commitments.

In 2011 Alex Donne Johnson opened up about the  collaboration in an article with Maxon entitled 'Vector Meldrew - Big In Japan'. The article states: Alex Donne Johnson, AKA Vector Meldrew, was running a music magazine's website at the time of setting sail in professional animation. Alex explains: "On April Fools' Day we decided to run a joke article about a group of musicians with a ridiculous past. We dressed and posed for a photo shoot and wrote the article saying things like we were 'big in Japan'."

Oddly enough, everyone seemed to fall for the joke. Even the biggest talent scouts in the music industry were taken in, getting in touch to find out more about the insane band who were big in Japan. "We thought it was so funny we turned the concept into an animation and used it to promote the website," continues Alex. "It was my first attempt at animating and it was terrible, but it was successful enough to drive a great deal of traffic to the website. Even the script writer, Matt Mason, went on to become a best-selling author and included the amusing anecdote in his book.":

In 2017, music publication TheRansomNote cited the Booo Krooo as the first in the grime comedy genre."Boo Kroo are pretty much forgotten now - they started life as a comic strip that appeared regularly in RWD Magazine. Three useless MCs trying to ride the garage wave, Boo Kroo were essentially a proto version of People Just Do Nothing. After proving a popular feature in the magazine, they levelled up to real world status by recording a track produced by a peak form Sticky."

. Gloriously, this Resident Advisor review from 2003 sees the point of the track whooshing over the reviewers head  “what's with those weird ass vocals,” he complains, bewildered “sounds like it's the work of one impressionist pulling off about 4 different personalities.” The article states: "The Sticky produced beat bangs. Released in 2003 – around the time Dizzee was pushing out his Ho! And Go! white labels, Boo Kroo Theme is unusually prescient in where the sound is going, with bratty MCs barring over a track that's little more than mean bass hits and cheap synth brass. A few years later Boo Kroo were given their own show on Channel U – which is how this video for the track came about. Episodes of which can be watched on this long defunct Boo Kroo website – after that, who knows? Any info on the creator would be appreciated… Classic or not, Boo Kroo Theme set the tone for the grime comedy that followed; stupid threats from over gassed road men.

Channel U 
In 2003, the Booo Krooo were commissioned for their first TV series for the launch of Channel U, a European music channel that focused on underground music.

In 2016, Darren Platt, founder of Channel U died. Cited by an obituary in The Guardian, "It forged a place for a genre that began its life ignored by the mainstream." Artists such as Stormzy paid tribute.

In 2018, Channel U closed it doors and has since been remembered for introducing the music careers of artists such as Dizzee Rascal, Kano, Wiley and Lethal Bizzle.

Premise and main characters 
The show revolved around three up-and-coming MCs: Bucky, Flexster and Giro, pioneers of pirate radio station 'Dunce FM'. The crew often ended up in situations where they were worse off than when they started.

Bucky is the leader of the gang, the brains behind the operation and the front MC. Giro is an MC/DJ and a notorious ladies man. Flexster is slightly less intelligent than his two friends, and an average MC at best. Together you can find them outside chicken shops, or "on road" causing trouble.

Discography 
"The Booo Krooo Theme", produced by Sticky, was released on Social Circles (JKSC040).

Episodes

Webisodes (2002)

Series 1 (2003)

References

External links 
 Booo Krooo on YouTube
 The Pirates Dillemma on Penguin Books
RWD magazine
 DAZZLE SHIP - Film and TV
 Booo Krooo on IMDB
Channel U Wiki (now Now 70s)

2000s British adult animated television series
British adult animated comedy television series
Grime music